The Dome was a German television program and music event, produced and broadcast by RTL 2 from 1997 to 2012. 

Roughly every three months, a new show was recorded in an event hall in different cities in Germany and Austria. In each episode, several national, but also international bands and musicians, perform their recent songs in front of a crowd of 5,000 to 15,000 people. Additionally, a compilation album was published when a new episode of The Dome was broadcast.

External links 
 Official website (German)
 List of episodes
 

1997 German television series debuts
German music television series
RTL Zwei original programming